The University of Magdalena, is a public, departmental, coeducational, research university based in the city of Santa Marta, Magdalena, Colombia.

It received high quality institutional accreditation from the Ministry of National Education on August 26, 2016, for a period of four years, being the second public university in the region to receive such accreditation.

See also

 List of universities in Colombia

Notes

External links
 University of Magdalena official site 

Universities and colleges in Colombia
Educational institutions established in 1958
1958 establishments in Colombia